Hipposauridae is an extinct family of biarmosuchian therapsids from the Late Permian of South Africa. It includes the genus Hipposaurus, and possibly the genera Hipposauroides and Pseudhipposaurus. A closely related biarmosuchian is Ictidorhinus, which has been placed in the family Ictidorhinidae.

References

Biarmosuchians
Lopingian first appearances
Lopingian extinctions
Prehistoric therapsid families
Taxa named by Alfred Romer